Ekrem Al (born 1 January 1955) is a Turkish football manager.

References

1955 births
Living people
Turkish football managers
Giresunspor managers
Akçaabat Sebatspor managers
Siirtspor managers
Göztepe S.K. managers
Yozgatspor managers
Elazığspor managers
Altay S.K. managers
Mardinspor managers
Orduspor managers
Şanlıurfaspor managers
Eyüpspor managers
Adanaspor managers
Sarıyer S.K. managers